Pastena is a comune (municipality) in the Province of Frosinone in the Italian region Lazio, located about  southeast of Rome and about  southeast of Frosinone.

Geography
Pastena borders the following municipalities: Castro dei Volsci, Falvaterra, Lenola, Pico, San Giovanni Incarico.

Main sights
Pastena Caves

References

External links

Official website 

Cities and towns in Lazio